Anthony Joseph Principi (born April 16, 1944) is the former United States Secretary of Veterans Affairs. He was appointed by President George W. Bush on January 23, 2001, and resigned on January 26, 2005. He Chaired the 2005 Defense Base Closure and Realignment Commission, BRAC  and is currently serving as a Consultant & Board member of several diverse Foundations & Corporations.

Early life
Principi was born in the East Bronx on April 16, 1944. He grew up in Teaneck, New Jersey and attended St. Anastasia School there during his younger years. He graduated from Mount Saint Michael Academy in 1962 as the school's top athlete and student council president. In 1967, Principi graduated from the United States Naval Academy at Annapolis, Maryland. He first saw active duty aboard the destroyer USS Joseph P. Kennedy. Principi later served in the Vietnam War, commanding a River Patrol Unit in the Mekong Delta.

Principi earned his Juris Doctor degree from Seton Hall in 1975, transferred from the Unrestricted Line as a Surface Warfare Officer to the Judge Advocate General Corps (JAGC) and was assigned to the United States Navy's JAGC office in San Diego. In 1980, he was transferred to Washington as a legislative counsel for the Department of the Navy.  He left active duty in 1980 after 14 years of commissioned service to serve as Republican counsel to the Senate Armed Services Committee at the invitation of Senator John Tower of Texas.

Career

Principi has worked on national policy issues and has held several executive-level positions in federal government throughout his career. He chaired the Federal Quality Institute in 1991, and was chairman of the Commission on Servicemembers and Veterans Transition Assistance established by Congress in 1996.

Principi served as Deputy Secretary of Veterans Affairs, VA's second-highest executive position, from March 17, 1989, to September 26, 1992, when he was named Acting Secretary of Veterans Affairs by President George H. W. Bush. He served in that position until January 1993.  Following that appointment, he served as Republican chief counsel and staff director of the United States Senate Committee on Armed Services.

From 1984 to 1988, he served as Republican chief counsel and staff director of the Senate Committee on Veterans' Affairs. He was the Veterans Administration's assistant deputy administrator for congressional and public affairs from 1983 to 1984, following three years as counsel to the chairman of the Senate Armed Services Committee.

On March 15, 2005, President George W. Bush appointed nine members to serve on the 2005 BRAC Commission, with Principi to serve as the chairman.  In October 2015, Principi was elected to the board of directors of Imprimis Pharmaceuticals.

References

External links

|-

|-

|-

1944 births
21st-century American politicians
United States Navy personnel of the Vietnam War
California lawyers
California Republicans
George W. Bush administration cabinet members
Lawyers who have represented the United States government
Living people
People from Teaneck, New Jersey
Seton Hall University School of Law alumni
United States Deputy Secretaries of Veterans Affairs
United States Naval Academy alumni
United States Navy officers
United States Secretaries of Veterans Affairs